Because of Your Love is songwriter Brenton Brown's second solo album, released in June 2008. Because of Your Love contains three "classic" Vineyard songs: 'Holy Holy', 'All who are thirsty' and 'Humble King'. Also it contains two co-writes with Paul Baloche 'Our God Saves' and 'Because Of Your Love'. To record this album Brenton worked with recording engineer Joe Baldridge (producer of Tree63's Sunday!) and guitarist Dwayne Larring who has worked with artists such as Backstreet Boys' Nick Carter and pop musician Kelly Clarkson.

Track listing
Because of Your Love
Wonderful
Adoration (with Leeland Mooring)
Come Let us Return (Gloria)
Holy
All Who are Thirsty
Lead Me
Stars
Amazing God
Rock of Ages You Will Stand
Send Your Rain
Our God Saves (with Paul Baloche)
Humble King

Brenton Brown albums
2006 albums